Debora Galves Lopez (born 17 May 1985) is a track cyclist and road cyclist from Spain. She represented her nation at the 2009 UCI Road World Championships in the Women's time trial. She competed in the scratch event at the 2011 UCI Track Cycling World Championships and in the individual pursuit event at the 2010 UCI Track Cycling World Championships.

References

External links
 profile at Procyclingstats.com
 Profile at cyclingarchives.com

1985 births
Spanish female cyclists
Living people
Place of birth missing (living people)
Sportspeople from Las Palmas
21st-century Spanish women